Manzonia heroensis is a species of minute sea snail, a marine gastropod mollusk or micromollusk in the family Rissoidae.

Description
The shell has a distinct spiral shape and usually has a brown or gray hue.

Distribution

References

Rissoidae
Gastropods described in 1992